Samuel Dexter (October 23, 1700 – January 29, 1755) was a minister from Dedham, Massachusetts. He ministered there from May 1724 to 1755.

Personal life

Dexter was born in Malden, Massachusetts on October 23, 1700. He graduated from Harvard College on 1720 and taught for a few years. On October 23, 1724, he married Catherine Mears of Roxbury. Together they had seven sons and four daughters. One daughter, Catherine, married the man who followed him in the Dedham pulpit, Jason Haven. He had fragile health, an extreme modesty, and "a disposition... to despondency." This made his life, he said, "very weary." He died January 29, 1755 and is buried in the Old Village Cemetery.

His son, who shared the name Samuel Dexter, served in the Great and General Court and on the Massachusetts Governor's Council. His grandson, also named Samuel Dexter, served in the administrations of John Adams and Thomas Jefferson.

Ministry
Before moving to Dedham, he turned down calls from churches in Yarmouth, Medford, Westborough, Hopkinton, and Brimfield. Dexter received a deathbed blessing from Increase Mather and was considered a young minister of great potential though "severely introspective and self-critical."

He preached in Dedham for the first time on October 15, 1722 and was called to minister at the First Church and Parish in Dedham several times, beginning in the fall of 1723. His call was opposed by some in the community, but it was for primarily political reasons, not necessarily theological ones. He finally accepted on December 15, 1723. Dexter was ordained on May 6, 1724, and served until his death on January 29, 1755. He lived in the home of his predecessor, Joseph Belcher; his successor and son-in-law, Jason Haven, would later live in it. It was across the street from the meetinghouse, the site of the present day Allin Congregational Church.

During his ministry, several outlying areas of Dedham began to establish their own churches. It was then that the church, which previously had been known as the Church of Christ, began to be called First Church in Dedham. After the churches split his ministry was "calm and quiet," but before he did there were members of the community, whom he called "certain sons of ignorance and pride," who insulted him to his face. Meetings were frequently called to correct the behavior of disorderly members and this led to an ecclesiastical council in July 1725.

Notes

References

Works cited

American clergy
Clergy from Dedham, Massachusetts
1700 births
1755 deaths
Harvard College alumni
Burials at Old Village Cemetery
People from colonial Dedham, Massachusetts
18th-century American clergy